Stump grinders can be the size of a lawn mower or as large as a truck.  Most accomplish their task by means of a high-speed disk with teeth that grinds the stump and roots into small chips.

A typical stump grinder incorporates a cutter wheel with fixed carbide teeth. The cutter wheel movements are controlled by hydraulic cylinders to push the cutter head laterally through the stump and to raise and lower it.

Stump grinding is done with the use of a very powerful, heavy, and potentially dangerous machine. Stump grinding is generally performed by a qualified arborist or landscaper. It is possible to rent a stump grinder from tool hire companies for DIY projects. 

If choosing to stump grind yourself, there are some safety rules that should be adhered to:

 Read and follow all instructions provided with the stump grinder rental or purchase. Stump grinding can literally become a life or death situation if done incorrectly, so this is important to the safety of all involved.
 Wear your protection- hard hat, safety goggles, earplugs, gloves, work boots, long sleeves, and pants, avoiding loose clothing, remove jewelry, and tie long hair back.
 Remove anything that you can see may become a projectile from around the work area such as small rocks
 Check with utility companies for possible underground pipes or wires.
 Set up a boundary around your work area for the safety and security of others.
 Stump grinding can be incredibly satisfying. Assuming the user is strong enough to handle the machine and all rules are followed, do it yourself stump grinding is a viable working option.

Vertical stump grinder
A stump grinder or stump cutter is a power tool or equipment attachment that removes tree stumps by means of a rotating cutting disc that chips away the wood.

Machines are available in various models and versions, to cover a power range from 70 to 300 Hp.

There are also types of stump grinders that are applied to tractors, excavators, skid steers and other earth moving and construction equipment. These machines can completely remove the roots of the trees or recover the central part of the roots. 

Vertical stump grinders are usually used in forests, for plant biomass, for the forestry sector, and for the maintenance of green areas, etc. Studies have shown that the normal stump grinder (with disc and teeth) can eliminate most of the first  of stumps.

They are made up of a sturdy gear box from which a transmission shaft emerges to which the cutting edges are connected.
Vertical grinders can remove the stump to a depth in the subsoil greater than one meter, while with normal horizontal grinders the stump is mostly shortened in the subsoil by 20 or 25 centimeters.

References

Logging
Grinding machines
Forestry equipment